Montbel is the name of two communes in France:

 Montbel, in the Ariège department
 Montbel, in the Lozère department

oc:Montbèl (Arièja)
zh:蒙特貝